Almenevsky District is an administrative and municipal district (raion), one of the twenty-four in Kurgan Oblast, Russia. It is located in the southwest of the oblast. Its administrative center is the rural locality (a selo) of Almenevo. Population:  15,240 (2002 Census);  The population of Almenevo accounts for 34.7% of the district's total population.

References

Notes

Sources

Districts of Kurgan Oblast